Indian Creek Township is a township in Anderson County, Kansas, United States. As of the 2010 census, its population was 127.

History
Indian Creek Township was established in 1873.

Geography

The stream of Little Indian Creek runs through this township.

References
 USGS Geographic Names Information System (GNIS)

External links
 US-Counties.com
 City-Data.com

Townships in Anderson County, Kansas
Townships in Kansas